Edward Bates (1793–1869) was a U.S. lawyer and statesman.

Edward Bates may also refer to:

 Edward Bates (department store), a department store in Kent
 Sir Edward Bates, 1st Baronet (1815–1896), ship-owner and politician
 Sir Edward Percy Bates, 2nd Baronet (1845–1899) of the Bates baronets
 Sir Edward Bertram Bates, 3rd Baronet (1877–1903) of the Bates baronets
 Edward Willard Bates (1884–1930), American physician

See also 
 Ted Bates (disambiguation)
 Bates (surname)

Bates, Edward